Dragiša Zečević (born 5 November 1980) is a Serbian football manager and former footballer who played as a midfielder and left back.
He is a head coach of the Women's Serbian national team for under-17.

References

External links
u-17 Team list
FK Rad manager

1980 births
Living people
Serbian footballers
Serbia and Montenegro football managers
Serbian football managers
Association football defenders
Association football midfielders